Tonje Angelsen (born 17 January 1990) is a Norwegian high jumper. Angelsen was considered a promising high jumper when she set a Norwegian age record at 1.82 m 16 years old (2006). Her career stalled somewhat because of injury until 2009. In 2010 and 2011 she qualified to several international championships but did not make it to the finals. 
In January 2012 she managed a personal best of 1.93 m indoors. At meeting in Oslo on 24 May she jumped to a new personal best outdoors of 1.95 m which was also the qualifying height for the 2012 Summer Olympics in London.

On 28 June 2012 she won a silver medal at the 2012 European Athletics Championships in Helsinki by jumping a height of 1.97 m, a new personal best.

Competition record

External links
IAAF profile for Angelsen

1990 births
Living people
Norwegian female high jumpers
Sportspeople from Trondheim
Athletes (track and field) at the 2012 Summer Olympics
Athletes (track and field) at the 2016 Summer Olympics
Olympic athletes of Norway
European Athletics Championships medalists
Norwegian Athletics Championships winners
World Athletics Championships athletes for Norway
21st-century Norwegian women